Mark Anthony Bradley (born January 29, 1982) is a former American football wide receiver and punt returner who played five seasons in the National Football League (NFL). He was drafted by the Chicago Bears in the second round of the 2005 NFL Draft. He played college football at Oklahoma.

Bradley also played for the Kansas City Chiefs, Tampa Bay Buccaneers, and New Orleans Saints. Bradley's father, Danny Bradley, played for the Los Angeles Rams and Detroit Lions. His mother Deborah Perry raised him in Pine Bluff, Arkansas.

Professional career

Pre-draft

Chicago Bears
Due to a season-ending injury against the Detroit Lions, Bradley was a small part of the Bears 2005 offense, starting only eight games, and recording just 18 receptions for 230 yards.

Following an injury to Bernard Berrian during week nine of the 2006 season, Bradley became a productive asset for the Bears’ offense.  While filling in for Berrian in the following weeks, Bradley caught two touchdown passes for 202 yards. He scored a 75-yard touchdown during the season finale in a 26-7 loss to the Green Bay Packers.

Bradley was released by the Bears on September 23, 2008 after the team signed cornerback Marcus Hamilton.

Kansas City Chiefs
Bradley was signed by the Kansas City Chiefs on October 1, 2008. He threw the first touchdown pass of his career to quarterback Tyler Thigpen, on a wide-receiver reverse trick play, against the Tampa Bay Buccaneers.

Bradley was released by the team on December 22, 2009 after the team re-signed wide receiver Quinten Lawrence.

Tampa Bay Buccaneers
Bradley was claimed off waivers by the Tampa Bay Buccaneers on December 23, 2009.

Bradley was released by the Buccaneers on June 16, 2010 to make room for sixth-round draft pick Brent Bowden. He failed to appear in a single game for the Buccaneers.

New Orleans Saints
Bradley signed with the New Orleans Saints on August 6, 2010.  The Saints released Bradley on August 24.

References

1982 births
Living people
American football wide receivers
Arkansas–Pine Bluff Golden Lions football players
Chicago Bears players
Kansas City Chiefs players
New Orleans Saints players
Oklahoma Sooners football players
Tampa Bay Buccaneers players
Sportspeople from Pine Bluff, Arkansas
Players of American football from Arkansas